Keithian Deshun "Bear" Alexander is an American football defensive lineman for the Georgia Bulldogs.

High school career 
Alexander attended IMG Academy in Bradenton, Florida. A four-star recruit, Alexander committed to play college football at the University of Georgia, over offers from Alabama, Florida, and Texas A&M.

College career 
During his freshman season, Alexander played in 12 games, recording nine tackles, three tackles for loss, and two sacks. He would tally a sack in the 2023 College Football Playoff National Championship Game, in a 65–7 victory.

References

External links 

 Georgia Bulldogs bio

Living people
African-American players of American football
Georgia Bulldogs football players
Players of American football from Texas
Year of birth missing (living people)